The Studio Murder Mystery is a 1929 American mystery film directed by Frank Tuttle and written by Ethel Doherty, A. Channing Edington, Carmen Ballen Edington, Joseph L. Mankiewicz and Frank Tuttle. The film stars Neil Hamilton, Doris Hill, Warner Oland, Fredric March, Chester Conklin, Florence Eldridge and Guy Oliver. The film was released on June 1, 1929, by Paramount Pictures.

Premise
Richard Hardell, an actor who has had many affairs, is murdered at a movie studio. His jealous wife Blanche, his director Rupert Borka, and a girl he mistreated, Helen MacDonald, all have reasons for wanting him dead.

Cast 
Neil Hamilton as Tony White
Doris Hill	as Helen MacDonald
Warner Oland as Rupert Borka
Fredric March as Richard Hardell
Chester Conklin as George 
Florence Eldridge as Blanche Hardell
Guy Oliver as MacDonald 
Donald MacKenzie as Captain Coffin
Gardner James as Ted MacDonald
Eugene Pallette as Detective Lieutenant Dirk

References

External links 
 

1929 films
1920s English-language films
American mystery films
1929 mystery films
Paramount Pictures films
Films directed by Frank Tuttle
American black-and-white films
Films scored by Karl Hajos
1920s American films